Orla Østerby (born 29 February 1952 in Bækmarksbro) is a Danish politician, who is a member of the Folketing. He was elected in the 2019 Danish general election as a member of Conservative People's Party. He left the party in December 2020 and has been an independent member of the Folketing since.

Political career
Østerby was a substitute member of the Folketing from 15 December 2016 to 5 June 2019, substituting for Søren Pape Poulsen. In 2019 he was elected into parliament for the Conservative People's Party on his own mandate. He left the party on 4 December 2020 and continued in parliament as an independent politician.

References

External links 
 Biography on the website of the Danish Parliament (Folketinget)

1952 births
Living people
People from Lemvig Municipality
Conservative People's Party (Denmark) politicians
Members of the Folketing 2019–2022